The following is a list of artists who make noise music.

A

Abruptum
Abu Lahab
AIDS Wolf
Maryanne Amacher
Oren Ambarchi
Anenzephalia
George Antheil
John Armleder
Koji Asano
Astro
Kenneth Atchley
Atrax Morgue
Aube
Autopsia
Tzvi Avni
Nigel Ayers

B

Bad Sector
John Balance
Blixa Bargeld
Bastard Noise
Dennis Báthory-Kitsz
Emil Beaulieau
Leila Bela
Philip Best
Joseph Beuys
Maurizio Bianchi
Big City Orchestra
Black Dice
Blackhouse
The Body
Jorge Boehringer
Borbetomagus
Boredoms
Boris Policeband
Matthew Bower
Garry Bradbury
Glenn Branca
Ray Brassier
George Brecht
Brighter Death Now
Bull of Heaven
Bush Tetras

C

C.C.C.C.
Neil Campbell
Caroliner
Kim Cascone
Monte Cazazza
Richard Chartier
Rhys Chatham
Chop Shop
Cisfinitum
Clipping
Club Moral
Cock E.S.P.
Coil
Nicolas Collins
Tony Conrad
Controlled Bleeding
Eric Copeland
Jean-Louis Costes
Clayton Counts
Coup de Grâce
Crack Fierce
Crash Worship
Cromagnon
Robin Crutchfield

D

Walter De Maria
Paul DeMarinis
Fortunato Depero
Poulomi Desai
Andrew Deutsch
Danny Devos
Diesel Guitar
Aaron Dilloway
DNA
Dreamcrusher
The Druds
Kevin Drumm
Jean Dubuffet
Marcel Duchamp
Dumb Numbers
Dumb Type
John Duncan

E

Einstürzende Neubauten
Leif Elggren
Alec Empire
Nic Endo
Esplendor Geométrico
Yamantaka Eye
Bradley Eros

F

Farmers Manual
Florian-Ayala Fauna
Henry Flynt
Ken Friedman
Ben Frost
Full of Hell
Fushitsusha

G

Gen Ken Montgomery
Genocide Organ
The Gerogerigegege
Gnaw Their Tongues
Gore Beyond Necropsy
Government Alpha
Antye Greie
Jeff Greinke
Randy Greif

H

Hafler Trio
Keiji Haino
Hair Police
Halaka
Hammerhead
Hanatarash
Harry Pussy
Russell Haswell
The Haters
Raoul Hausmann
Carl Michael von Hausswolff
Florian Hecker
Erdem Helvacıoğlu
Juan Hidalgo Codorniu
Hijokaidan
Kommissar Hjuler
Cat Hope
Richard Huelsenbeck
Hwyl Nofio

I

If, Bwana
Ryoji Ikeda
Incapacitants
Martín Irigoyen
Manuel Rocha Iturbide

J

David Jackman
Phil Nyokai James
Philip Jeck
Joe Jones
GX Jupitter-Larsen

K

Istvan Kantor
Kapotte Muziek
Thanasis Kaproulias
Zbigniew Karkowski
Lajos Kassák
KK Null
Milan Knížák
Knurl
Ron Kuivila

L

Yuri Landman
Alan Licht
Lil Ugly Mane
Lingua Ignota
Francisco López

M

Yoshio Machida
Angus MacLise
Macronympha
Maeror Tri
Mama Baer
Man Is the Bastard
Christian Marclay
Lasse Marhaug
Filippo Tommaso Marinetti
Mars
Masonna
Stephan Mathieu
Mattin
Mauthausen Orchestra
Daniel Menche
Merzbow
Metal Machine Trio
Metalux
Kenny Millions
Minóy
Monde Bruits
Monotract
Thurston Moore
Morphogenesis
David Moss
MOZ
Muslimgauze

N

Toshimaru Nakamura
Nautical Almanac
Joseph Nechvatal
Neptune
Nickolas Mohanna
Nihilist Spasm Band
Hermann Nitsch
Nocturnal Emissions
Noisegate
Nordvargr
Nurse with Wound

O

Stephen O'Malley
Oneida
Ortiz Morales
Otomo Yoshihide

P

P16.D4
Nam June Paik
Panicsville
Pan Sonic
Steven Parrino
PBK
Pharmakon
Pimmon
Pink and Brown
Franz Pomassl
Portal
Francesco Balilla Pratella
PRE
Premature Ejaculation
Seth Price
Primitive Man
Prurient
Psyclones
Psychic TV
Puce Mary

R

Dick Raaymakers
Ramleh
Richard Ramirez
Lee Ranaldo
Rat at Rat R
Red Square
Lou Reed (Metal Machine Music) (1975)
Peter Rehberg
The Residents
Boyd Rice (NON)
Keith Rowe
Antonio Russolo
Luigi Russolo
Walter Ruttmann
Jessica Rylan

S

Sachiko M
David Schafer
R. Murray Schafer
Marcus Schmickler
Nicolas Schöffer
Severed Heads
Sissy Spacek
Smegma
Michael Snow
Solmania
Spore
SPK
Steven Stapleton
Howard Stelzer
Stendeck
Robin Storey
Stratvm Terror
Suckdog
Szkieve

T

The Tape-beatles
Tarmvred
Terrestrial Tones
Test Dept
J. G. Thirlwell
Larry Thrasher
Throbbing Gristle
Asmus Tietchens
Jean Tinguely
To Live and Shave in L.A.
Yasunao Tone

V

V/Vm
Mika Vainio
Violent Onsen Geisha
Stephen Vitiello
Wolf Vostell

W

Wapstan
John Watermann
Robert Watts
Weena Morloch
Weird Little Boy
John Wiese
Hildegard Westerkamp
Whitehouse
Keith Fullerton Whitman
Oscar Wiggli
Wolf Eyes

X

XBXRX
Xela
Xome

Y

Justice Yeldham
Yellow Swans
Y Pants

Z

Zaj
Z'EV
Pavel Zhagun
Zoviet France
Zweizz

See also

List of industrial music bands
List of Japanoise artists
List of noise rock bands

References

Books

 
 
 
 

Noise